Educating Joey Essex is a British television programme which began airing on ITV2 on 16 March 2014. The show features former The Only Way Is Essex star Joey Essex and is narrated by Phillip Schofield. The show title is a similarity to the 2011 Channel 4 reality show Educating Essex.

The first programme aired in March 2014 and was originally planned to be a one-off special. On 5 June 2014, a full series was announced.

In 2016 it was announced that Educating Joey Essex would return for a second series filming started in April. Series 2 premiered 12 June 2016.

Essex announced whilst on ITV This Morning on 28 June 2017 that he would like to do another series of Educating Joey Essex or a one-off special. Joey also said that there needs to be a reason to do another episode or series and at the moment there isn't but the series is still on his mind for a return.

Series overview

Series One

Series Two

Notes
 There is also going to be a US election special, starring Donald Trump and Hillary Clinton.

For episode 3 in series 2, filming also took place on 25 August 2016 before transmission later that day where Joey Essex receives his GCSE results.

Episode 4,5, and 6 was a three parter.

Releases
Three episodes of series one have been made available on Amazon Instant Video UK

References

External links
Official Twitter

2010s British reality television series
2014 British television series debuts
2016 British television series endings
English-language television shows
ITV reality television shows
Television series by All3Media